Beomgye Station is a station on Line 4 of the Seoul Subway network. It is between Geumjeong station and Pyeongchon station, in a newer area of Anyang, Gyeonggi-do and, heading away from Seoul, it is the last underground station on this line. It opens at 4:30 A.M. Beomgye Station features an area known as "Beomgye Rodeo," which is well known for its shopping, active nightlife, and array of traditional Korean restaurants. It is connected to a Lotte Department Store and Newcore outlet. Lotte Department Store has been open since 2012. There are 9 exits. There are exits 1, 2, 3, 4, 4-1, 5, 6, 7, and 8.

The name of the station literally means "A river full of tigers."

Station layout

References

Metro stations in Anyang, Gyeonggi
Seoul Metropolitan Subway stations
Railway stations opened in 1993